The 2021–22 Dartmouth Big Green Men's ice hockey season was the 115th season of play for the program and the 60th season in the ECAC Hockey conference. The Big Green represented the Dartmouth College and were coached by Reid Cashman, in his 1st season as head coach.

Season
Dartmouth returned to the ice after their previous season was cancelled due to the COVID-19 pandemic. The Big Green began the year with a decent stretch, opening 2–3 with two of their losses coming against ranked teams. After a serviceable start, went winless in 6 consecutive games and ended the first half of their season near the bottom of the conference standings.

After Christmas, Dartmouth opened their annual in-season tournament with a win over in-state rival New Hampshire. Unfortunately for the Big Green, the team would not record another victory for a month and a half. The biggest problem for Dartmouth was a lack of offense that continued for most of the season. The goaltending they received during the stretch gave Dartmouth several chances to win but the team's scoring rarely made an appearance.

Near the end of the season, Dartmouth put together a few wins that just put them above Yale and prevented the Greens from finishing last in ECAC Hockey. That set them up for a showdown with Rensselaer in the conference tournament. When the team won its first match, it appeared that they may have accidentally found a way to extend their season. However, Dartmouth got into penalty trouble in the next two games, surrendering five power play goals, and lost both matches to end their year.

Departures

Recruiting

Roster
As of August 19, 2021.

Standings

Schedule and results

|-
!colspan=12 style=";" | Exhibition

|-
!colspan=12 style=";" | Regular Season

|-
!colspan=12 ! style=""; | 

|-
!colspan=12 style=";" | 

|- align="center" bgcolor="#e0e0e0"
|colspan=12|Dartmouth Won Series 1–2

Scoring statistics

Goaltending statistics

Rankings

Note: USCHO did not release a poll in week 24.

Awards and honors

References

2021-22
Dartmouth Big Green
Dartmouth Big Green
Dartmouth Big Green
Dartmouth Big Green